Bambu is an unfinished studio album by American songwriter-musician Dennis Wilson, co-founder of the Beach Boys, intended as the follow-up to his debut Pacific Ocean Blue. In 2008, recordings from the album were compiled as bonus tracks for the first CD issue of Pacific Ocean Blue. In 2017, the same track selection was given a dedicated release, titled Bambu (The Caribou Sessions).

Background
Bambu began production in 1978 at Brother Studios in Santa Monica with the collaboration of then Beach Boys keyboardist and Dennis Wilson's close friend Carli Muñoz as songwriter and producer. The first four songs that were officially recorded for Bambu were Muñoz's compositions: "It's Not Too Late", "Constant Companion", "All Alone", and "Under the Moonlight". The project was initially scuttled by lack of financing and the distractions of simultaneous Beach Boys projects. Bambu was released in 2008 along with the Pacific Ocean Blue reissue. Two songs from the Bambu sessions, "Love Surrounds Me" and "Baby Blue", were lifted for the Beach Boys' 1979 L.A. (Light Album). “Baby Blue” was not included on either the 2008 or 2018 releases of Bambu because most of the song features lead vocals by Carl Wilson.

Track listing
The following pertains to the 2017 vinyl issue, which duplicates a track sequence that first appeared as disc two of Pacific Ocean Blue (30th Anniversary Edition).

References

External links
Official Site (2008 reissue)
Uncut's Review
Record Store Day article 2017

Dennis Wilson albums
2017 albums
Caribou Records albums
Albums produced by Dennis Wilson
Albums produced by Gregg Jakobson
Albums published posthumously
Unfinished albums